Michael Hurd may refer to:
Michael Hurd (composer) (1928–2006), English composer 
Michael Hurd (priest) (born 1944), Dean of Nelson
Michael Hurd (runner), road runner and winner of the Reading Half Marathon in 1984